James Colledge Pope,  (June 11, 1826 – May 8, 1885) was a land proprietor and politician on Prince Edward Island (PEI), Canada. He served as premier of the colony from 1865 to 1867, and from 1870 to 1873. He was premier of PEI in 1873 when the island joined Canadian confederation.

He was born in Bedeque, Prince Edward Island, the son of Joseph Pope and Lucy Colledge. Pope was a successful businessman who was at one point the island's third largest shipowner. He entered PEI politics in 1857 when the island was still a colony of the United Kingdom. He was a member of the Conservative Party, and defended the rights of landowners against growing demands by tenant farmers for land reform.

Pope was named to the Executive Council in 1859, joining the Conservative government of Edward Palmer. In 1865, he became Premier after a dispute over Canadian confederation resulted in Palmer and John Hamilton Gray resigning from the Executive Council. While not hostile to confederation, Pope did not agree with the terms set by the Quebec Conference. A particular problem was the unresolved land question, which pitted the demands of tenant farmers for land reform against demands by landlords for compensation. The question had led to violence, and, in 1865, Pope used soldiers to put down disturbances led by the Tenant League. The next year, his government negotiated the purchase of the large Cunard estate, which composed 15% of the island's land mass, in order to redistribute the land to over 1,000 tenants. The colony lacked the funds to purchase all the island's proprietary estates.

Pope was in Britain during the London Conference (on the question of Confederation) of 1867, and persuaded delegates to agree to $800,000 being allocated by the federal treasury to buy proprietary lands on PEI so that they could be distributed to tenants. This was seen as bribery on the island, however, and divided the Tories, leading to their defeat in the 1867 election at the hands of the Liberals, who were more hostile to confederation. The Tories were also hurt by their reputation as being pro-landlord: the Tenant League campaigned to defeat the Pope government.

Pope returned to the premiership in 1870 leading a coalition government of Conservatives and Liberals. The question of school funding and the role of separate schools divided the province and both political parties, and caused the fall of Robert Poore Haythorne's Liberal government. Pope was able to form a coalition between his Tories and dissident Liberals by promising not to act on the question of schools, or confederation, before an election. The new government instead moved to commence the construction of a railway on the island in 1871. The railway proved to be a severe economic burden that almost bankrupted the island. The government lost a by-election on the railway issue, and Pope, as a result, lost his governing majority in the House of Assembly, and was forced to resign in 1872.

The financial crisis caused by the railway, and the ability of the Canadian government to bail the island out, was a major factor in the colony finally agreeing to seek to join Canadian confederation. The Liberal government of Robert Poore Haythorne sent a delegation to Ottawa, Ontario in February 1873 seeking terms to admission to Canada. Ottawa agreed to take over the railway, provide funds to settle the land question, assume the colony's debts and give the new province an annual subsidy. The Liberals called an election on the proposal. Pope's Tories argued that the terms were not good enough, and that, if elected, his government would obtain more favourable conditions. Pope's party won 20 out of 30 seats in the April election, and he proceeded to Ottawa where he persuaded the Canadian government to increase the promised annual subsidy to PEI by a further $25,000.

PEI entered confederation on July 1, 1873. Pope's third stint as Premier ended in September 1873 when he won a seat in the House of Commons of Canada. He did not run in the 1874 federal election, however, and returned to the province's House of Assembly in 1875, although he did not return to government. In 1876, he lost his seat in the provincial election which was fought on the issue of school funding and particularly separate schools. Pope's position was considered too moderate for voters who supported a secular system. The next year, he returned to the House of Commons and served as Minister of Marine and Fisheries from 1878 to 1882 in the Conservative government of Sir John A. Macdonald.

References
 
 

1826 births
1885 deaths
Canadian Anglicans
Conservative Party of Canada (1867–1942) MPs
Members of the House of Commons of Canada from Prince Edward Island
Members of the King's Privy Council for Canada
People from Prince County, Prince Edward Island
Premiers of Prince Edward Island
Progressive Conservative Party of Prince Edward Island MLAs
Persons of National Historic Significance (Canada)
Progressive Conservative Party of Prince Edward Island leaders
Colony of Prince Edward Island people